Glenone is a small village and townland in County Londonderry, Northern Ireland. In the 2001 Census it had a population of 318. It is situated within Mid-Ulster district.

Portglenone lies a short distance across the Lower River Bann (to the east) and Inishrush is a short distance to the west.

References 

NI Neighbourhood Information System
Draft Magherafelt Area Plan 2015

Villages in County Londonderry
Mid-Ulster District